is a Japanese jazz pianist, composer and writer. His piano style is influenced by free jazz, modal jazz and soul jazz.

Since the late 1980s, Yamashita's main performing group has consisted of Cecil McBee (bass), Pheeroan akLaff (drums), and often Joe Lovano (saxophone).

Early life
Yamashita was born in Tokyo, Japan, on 26 February 1942. He had violin lessons between the ages of nine and 15, and switched to piano in his teens.

Later life and career
Yamashita first played piano professionally in 1959, at the age of 17, and attended the Kunitachi College of Music and studied classical composition from 1962 to 1967. In the early 1960s, he "was part of a group, with Terumasa Hino and Masabumi Kikuchi, that met at a jazz club called  to play and discuss jazz every night". Yamashita's first released recording was in 1963, and he became a pioneer of avant-garde and free jazz. In 1969, he formed the Yosuke Yamashita Trio. In 1974, the trio of Yamashita, Akira Sakata (alto sax) and Takeo Moriyama (drums) went on the first of a series of successful European tours, which helped spread beyond Japan Yamashita's and the trio's reputation as driving, fully committed free jazz musicians. The trio broke up in 1983.

In the 1980s, Yamashita formed his New York Trio with bassist Cecil McBee and drummer Pheeroan akLaff. In 1994, he was invited to perform at the 50th anniversary concert of jazz label Verve, held at Carnegie Hall. He provided the music for films such as Inflatable Sex Doll of the Wastelands and Dr. Akagi. He has also led a big band "that combined swing music with free jazz". He has been a visiting professor of music at Senzoku Gakuen College of Music, Nagoya University of Arts, and his alma mater, Kunitachi College of Music, in addition to publishing work on improvisation and music.

Yamashita performed on a burning piano in 1973 when asked by Japanese graphic designer Kiyoshi Awazu to be the subject in his short film, burning piano. Thirty-five years later, clothed in a protective firefighter's uniform, Yamashita repeated the performance on a beach in western Japan, playing jazz improvisations on a piano which had been set alight.

Yamashita is in charge of visiting professor of Jazz course in Kunitachi College of Music since 2010.

Playing style and influence
Critic Marc Moses, writing for The Japan Times in 1990, commented that "It is not an exaggeration to say that Yamashita is probably more responsible than any other individual for broadening the horizon of the creative Japanese jazz scene."

Awards
In 1990, he was awarded the Fumio Nanri award.
In 1999, at the Mainichi Film Concours he was awarded "Best Film Score" for Dr. Akagi.

Discography

Jazz albums

As leader/co-leader
  (self released, 1969) – the first live recording at Waseda University with Seiichi Nakamura and Takeo Moriyama
 Concert in New Jazz (Teichiku/Union Jazz, 1969) - the first professional live recording with Seiichi Nakamura and Takeo Moriyama
 Mina's Second Theme (Victor, 1969) – studio, trio with Seiichi Nakamura and Takeo Moriyama
  (Victor, 1970) – studio, trio with Seiichi Nakamura and Takeo Moriyama
 April Fool: Coming Muhammad Ali (URC, 1972) – studio, trio with Seiichi Nakamura and Takeo Moriyama
 with Masahiko Sato, Piano Duo (Columbia, 1974) – live at Asahi Seimei Hall, 
 Clay (Enja, 1974) – studio, trio with Akira Sakata, Takeo Moriyama
 Yosuke Alone (Bellwood, 1974) – solo
  with Manfred Schoof, Akira Sakata, Takeo Moriyama, Distant Thunder (Enja, 1975) – live
 Breathtake (Frasco, 1975) – solo
 Chiasma (MPS, 1976) – with Akira Sakata, Takeo Moriyama, recorded in 1975
 Banslikana (Enja, 1976) – solo, recorded in 1975
 with Yasutaka Tsutsui,  (Frasco, 1976) – recorded in 1975-76
 A day in Music (Frasco, 1976) – duo with Adelhard Roidinger
 Montreux Afterglow (Frasco, 1976) – trio live at Montreux Jazz Festival
  (Frasco, 1976) – with Gerald Oshita, 
 Umbrella Dance' (Frasco, 1977)
 with Adelhard Roidinger, Inner Space (Enja, 1977)
 Wave Song (Frasco, 1977) – with Adelhard Roidinger
 with Yasutaka Tsutsui,  (Victor/Super Fuji Discs, 1978)
  (Frasco, 1978?)
 Invitation – Yosuke In The Gallery (Frasco, 1979)
 First Time (Frasco, 1979)
 with Haruna Miyake, Exchange (Victor, 1979)
  Vol. 1 and Vol.2 (Frasco, 1981)
 Picasso - Live, And Then... (Columbia, 1983) - recorded in 1982. CD reissue in 2015.
  (Columbia, 1983)
 It Don't Mean a Thing (DIW, 1984) – solo
 with Hozan Yamamoto, Masahiko Togashi, Breath (Denon, 1984)
 It Don't Mean A Thing (DIW, 1984)
 with Ruri Shimada, Goji Hamada, V.A., Winter Music (Locus Solus, 1985)
 Sentimental (Kitty, 1985)
 with Mal Waldron, Piano Duo Live At Pit Inn (CBS/Sony, 1986)
 with Kodō, In Live (Denon, 1986)
 Rhapsody in Blue (Kitty, 1986)
 with Hozan Yamamoto, Bolero (Enja, 1986)
 Plays Gershwin (Kitty, 1989)
 Crescendo - Live At Sweet Basil (Kitty, 1989)
 Sakura (Verve, 1990) – with Cecil McBee and Pheeroan Aklaff
 Sakura Live (Verve, 1991) – with Cecil McBee and Pheeroan Aklaff
 Kurdish Dance (Verve, 1992) – with Cecil McBee and Pheeroan Aklaff
 Dazzling Days (Verve, 1993) – with Lovano, Cecil McBee and Pheeroan Aklaff
 Asian Games (Verve Forecast, 1993) – with Bill Laswell and Ryuichi Sakamoto
 Playground (Verve, 1993)
 Ways of Time (Verve, 1995) – with Tim Berne, Lovano, Cecil McBee and Pheeroan Aklaff
 Spider (Verve, 1996) – with Cecil McBee and Pheeroan Aklaff
 Canvas In Quiet - Homage To Morio Matsui (Verve, 1996)
 Stone Flower - Homage To A.C. Jobim (JVC, 1997)
 Duo Live in Warehouse with Eitetsu Hayashi (King/Raijin, 1998) - live in Tokyo
 Ballads For You (Trial, 1998) - live in Fuji, Shizuoka
 Golden Circle "6" (Trial, 1999) - live in Hamamatsu
 Fragments 1999 (Verve, 1999) – with Cecil McBee and Pheeroan Aklaff
 Resonant Memories (Verve, 2001) – solo. recorded in 2000.
 Graceful Illusion (Universal Music, 2004)
 Delightful Contrast (Universal, 2011) – with Cecil McBee and Pheeroan Aklaff
 Yamashita, Yosuke Trio (DIW, 2012) - recorded in 1973
 Grandioso (Universal, 2013) – with Cecil McBee and Pheeroan Aklaff
  (JamRice, 2014) – with special bigband
  (Velvet Sun, 2014) – with 
  (JamRice, 2015) - with special bigband
 In Europe 1983 -complete edition- (Columbia, 2015) - recorded in Germany 1983
  with Cecil McBee and Pheeroan Aklaff (Verve, 2018)As chamber ensemble “”(with Shigeharu Mukai and Yahiro Tomohiro)
  (Zizo, 2002)

Other appearancesAs sideman'''
 Masahiko Togashi & Masayuki Takayanagi,  (TBM, 1972) - the first recording in 1963
 Isso Yukihiro,  (King, 1990)
 , Gathering (Sony, 1991) - live
 Nobuyasu Okabayashi, Made in Japan (Toshiba EMI, 1992)
 Magokoro brothers,  (Sony/"Ki/oon", 1992)
 Kim Dae-hwan, Black Roots (nices, 1993) - live in Seoul, recorded in 1991
 Sachi Hayasaka & Stir Up! 2.26 (Enja, 1994) - live, recorded in 1992
 Kazumi Watanabe,  (Universal/domo, 1994)
 Shuichi Murakami, Welcome to My Life (Victor, 1998)
 Black Out (Jazz), 1999/2.26 Live (Nbagi, 1999)
 Yuki Maeda, Jazz Age: Gershwin Song Book (ewe, 1999)
 T-Square (band),  (SMA, 2012)
 Toshi Ichiyanagi, Piano Concerto No.4 "Jazz", Piano Concerto No.5 "Finland", Concerto for Marimba and Orchestra (Camerata Tokyo, 2013)
 Saki Takaoka, Sings - Bedtime Stories (Victor, 2014)
 Bennie Wallace, Brilliant Corners (Denon, 2015) - recorded in 1986
 Nobuyasu Okabayashi, Requiem – The Heart of Misora Hibari (EMI Music Japan, 2010)
 Nao Takeuchi, Obsidian (What's New, 2010)
 Shinnosuke Takahashi, Blues 4 Us - Live at Shinjyuku Pit Inn (Pit Inn, 2011)
 Akira Horikoshi & , Lotus Position (Waternet Sound, 2016)
 Asako Motojima, Melodies of Memories (Greenfin, 2017)
 Nobuyasu Okabayashi, (DIW, 2018)

Omnibus Albums
 Jazz in Tokyo '69 (Tact, 1969)
 Memories of Bill Evans (Victor, 1999)
 Gets Gilberto + 50 (verve, 2013)

Soundtrack
  (Tokuma Japan, 1986; re-issue 2002)
 Dr. Kanzo Original Soundtrack / Yosuke Yamashita on Cinema (Verve, 1998)
 Vengeance for Sale Original Soundtrack (Vap, 2002)
  Soundtrack (Ultra-Vybe, 2008) - recorded in 1972
 Shirō Sagisu,  (King, 2013)
  (Avex Classics, 2018) - with Minami Kizuki(vo)
  (Avex Classics, 2018) - with Minami Kizuki(vo)

Selective classical compositions
 "Yōsuke Yamashita: Piano Concerto No.1 ENCOUNTER for Improviser"
 in Yōsuke Yamashita, Yutaka Sado and RAI National Symphony Orchestra Yōsuke Yamashita: Piano Concerto No.1 ENCOUNTER (Avex Classics, 2007)
 and Yōsuke Yamashita, Yutaka Sado and  Rhapsody in Blue (Avex Classics, 2014)

 "Yōsuke Yamashita: Piano Concerto No.3 EXPLORER" in Yōsuke Yamashita, Yutaka Sado Explorer×Sudden Fiction (Avex Classics, 2008) - with Tokyo Philharmonic Orchestra

References

External links
Official site

1942 births
Living people
Enja Records artists
Japanese jazz pianists
Musicians from Tokyo
Recipients of the Medal with Purple Ribbon
Kunitachi College of Music alumni
21st-century pianists
Bellaphon Records artists